Esmond is an unincorporated community in South Grove Township, DeKalb County, Illinois, United States.

Geography
Esmond is located at  (42.0336383, -88.9356512).

See also
Ashelford Hall

References

Unincorporated communities in DeKalb County, Illinois
Unincorporated communities in Illinois